AOH can refer to:
Ancient Order of Hibernians
Ambassadors of Harmony
Academy of hope
Lima Allen County Airport
Telegram code of Shanghai Hongqiao railway station